AEK Futsal Club is a Greek futsal club established in 2008 by a merger with the O.F. Geraka Futsal team. They participated in the B'Ethniki (second division) that year, where they finished 1st in the regular season and 2nd in the playoffs. AEK played again in the second division in 2009–10. AEK finished second in the B'Ethniki after the playoffs in April 2010, and gained promotion to the first division for 2010–11. AEK won the first title since the establishment of the department of Futsal at 3 June 2018, after beating 1–0 Olympiada Agia Paraskevi at the 2017–18 Hellenic Cup final.

History

The years of creation
The Futsal section of AEK was initially started when, in cooperation with OF Gerakas in the summer of 2008, the forthcoming merger was launched at the end of the season, since there was no other way, with the dates for the participation of a new club in the 2nd National room. The newly created department undertook to create and organize 5 fans of the Dichefalu, aiming and guiding the presence of AEK, and in the field of the football court. Eventually the team finished second in the 2008–09 season and moved to the 1st National.

However, the Federation's refusal to join AEK for a merger with Gerakas, made the immediate need to create a new division under A.E.K., and to participate again in the 2nd National Championship as a newly established club for the next season 2009–10. The men's team fought in closed Gerakas, winning the first National Division, finishing 1st in the group, relying solely on AEK-winning players, who were chosen among many in summer friendly trials, all out of the box. Reference point: The department has never charged the amateur AEK fund at a cost, as it has survived financially thanks to the help of AEK fans.

Creation of Academies
In the summer of 2010, the need to create a football academy, which was necessary for the participation of the men's team in the 1st National category, led the department's directors to the first big call of the AEK world through Media, Fun Weekend and advertisements for the creation of a new AEK Academy, for children from 6 years old and over, 7 newly new children, joined the initial scheme of the newly established academy, of various ages, with the right to participate in the infrastructure championship. The men's team finishes in the 7th place of the 1st National Championship, a huge success, in the first prize in this championship, having sent 4 players to the National Team, compensating for their excellent appearances and having their 1st scorer Greek Championship, and reaching the Greek Cup semifinals, losing the qualification to the final in the last minute of the match. The academy now has 1 division of athletes throughout the year, managing to finish with 3 divisions, with 30 children from 6 to 13 years old.

In the summer of 2011 the sudden departure of four international players for a number of reasons, and their inadequate replacement, with other equally professional footballers, since it was the philosophy of the department's officers, brought to the team a great sporting turmoil, resulting in team, to stay early off racing goals, finishing in 10th place. The academy has now begun to grow and as a result it has reached the winner of the Greek Cup in the category of Juniors, defeating Athina 90 with 2–1. Also, the team of Pampas is also giving its 1st presence to the Final 4 Cup, Greece, with the participation of younger players. Thus, the year ends with AEK FC, honoring 25,000 people in the last game of Nikos Liberopoulos and Traianos Dellas, the Juniors team, and celebrating with the fans of AEK.

Administrative Changes
The next season, 2012–13, was a season of administrative developments in the AEK section of the Salon, as the initial team of the five founding members was leaving the scene for a number of reasons. Thus, in the face of the danger, to dissolve all this effort for 3 years, since one did not undertake to pursue the specific project, the management of the Amateur AEK assigned the department's responsibility to the coach of the men's team and the head of the academy, Dimitris Kountardas as the department's chief, with his immediate partners, Stavros Mavrakis and Manos Hadjidrodis. The men's team is significantly strengthened, with the arrival of 4-5 experienced footballers, moves to its new headquarters, the closed Nicolakakis and the coaching twin, creates a strong team that brings it to the first quarter of the Championship. The Academy now has 120 athletes, of all ages, from 4 to 17 years old, with 4 racing segments EPO departments. and eight other leading parties, hosted at Paradise Park and Closed Nicolakakis. Also, a second sports house is being created in the area of Gerakas, where there are also 20 young athletes from AEK, the eastern suburbs of Attica.

The first title
AEK won the first title since the establishment of the department of Futsal at 3 June 2018, after beating 1–0 Olympiada Agia Paraskevi at the 2017–18 Hellenic Cup final.

Recent seasons

European competitions record 

Last update: 14 December 2020

Players

Current squad
Last Update: 16 January 2023

Technical & Academies staff

Honours

Domestic competitions

League titles
Hellenic Super League Men
  Winners (2): 2019, 2020
  Runner-up (1): 2021

Hellenic Super League Women
  Winners (1): 2019
  Runner-up (2): 2021, 2022

Cups
Hellenic Futsal Cup Men
  Winners (1): 2018
  Runner-up (1): 2017

Hellenic Futsal Cup Women
  Winners (1): 2022

Hellenic Super Cup Men
  Winners (2): 2018, 2019

Hellenic Futsal Super Cup Women
  Winners (1): 2022

Youth teams
Greek League U11 Men (1): 2018

Notable players

  Tolis Ntelos
  Nikos Pavlou
  Christos Achis
  Hugo Ramada Martins

Notable coaches
  Apostolos Beltsidis
  Giannis Ziavas

Sponsorships
Great Sponsor: TBD
Official Sport Clothing Manufacturer: Macron

References

External links
Official websites
 
A.E.K. Official Website – Futsal 
Media
Official Facebook page

Futsal
Futsal clubs in Greece
Futsal clubs established in 2008
2008 establishments in Greece